The Anglican Diocese of Aba Ngwa North is one of nine within the Anglican Province of Aba, itself one of 14 provinces within the Church of Nigeria. The current bishop is Nathan Kanu.

The diocese was established in 2007 and the pioneer bishop was John Ezirim. After his death in 2008, Nathan Kanu was consecrated as the second bishop on 29 April 2009.

Notes

Dioceses of the Province of Aba
 
Church of Nigeria dioceses